Centerville (formerly, Kings River, King River, Scottsburgh, and Scottsburg) is a census-designated place in Fresno County, California. At the 2010 census, it had a population of 392.

History
Scottsburg was founded in 1854 in the low lands of the Kings River at Poole's Crossing. In 1858, W. W. Hills established Hills Ferry at Poole's Crossing. The ferry and the town were destroyed in the winter of 1861-1862. It was rebuilt on higher ground, but it was flooded again in 1867. The town was rebuilt on top of a bluff overlooking its prior location and renamed Centerville.

The Scottsburgh post office opened in 1856, closed in 1858, re-opened in 1859, and closed forever in 1864.

Demographics
At the 2010 census Centerville had a population of 392. The racial makeup of Centerville was 321 (81.9%) White, 1 (0.3%) African American, 9 (2.3%) Native American, 20 (5.1%) Asian, 0 (0.0%) Pacific Islander, 33 (8.4%) from other races, and 8 (2.0%) from two or more races. Hispanic or Latino of any race were 99 people (25.3%).

The whole population lived in households, no one lived in non-institutionalized group quarters and no one was institutionalized.

There were 154 households, 42 (27.3%) had children under the age of 18 living in them, 77 (50.0%) were opposite-sex married couples living together, 12 (7.8%) had a female householder with no husband present, 12 (7.8%) had a male householder with no wife present.  There were 7 (4.5%) unmarried opposite-sex partnerships, and 2 (1.3%) same-sex married couples or partnerships. 39 households (25.3%) were one person and 13 (8.4%) had someone living alone who was 65 or older. The average household size was 2.55.  There were 101 families (65.6% of households); the average family size was 3.16.

The age distribution was 78 people (19.9%) under the age of 18, 30 people (7.7%) aged 18 to 24, 81 people (20.7%) aged 25 to 44, 132 people (33.7%) aged 45 to 64, and 71 people (18.1%) who were 65 or older.  The median age was 46.6 years. For every 100 females, there were 111.9 males.  For every 100 females age 18 and over, there were 115.1 males.

There were 167 housing units at an average density of 20.5 per square mile (7.9/km2),of which 154 were occupied, 95 (61.7%) by the owners and 59 (38.3%) by renters.  The homeowner vacancy rate was 2.0%; the rental vacancy rate was 1.7%.  225 people (57.4% of the population) lived in owner-occupied housing units and 167 people (42.6%) lived in rental housing units.

References

Census-designated places in Fresno County, California
Kings River (California)
Populated places established in 1854
1854 establishments in California
Census-designated places in California